Rudolf Schwemmbauer (26 October 1943 – 13 January 2022) was a German politician. He died on 13 January 2022, at the age of 78.

References

1943 births
2022 deaths
Christian Social Union in Bavaria politicians
People from Ansbach (district)
Recipients of the Cross of the Order of Merit of the Federal Republic of Germany